The Sulța is a right tributary of the river Trotuș in Romania. It discharges into the Trotuș in the village Sulța.

Tributaries

The following rivers are tributaries to the river Sulța:

Left: Morăreni, Valea Lupului, Hotar, Cotumbița
Right: Delnița, Pietrosul, Burda, Agărașul, Burda Nouă, Cristeșul, Șolintari (or Cărunta)

References

Rivers of Romania
Rivers of Bacău County